An ounceland is a traditional Scottish land measurement. It was found in the West Highlands, and Hebrides. In Eastern Scotland, other measuring systems were used instead. It was equivalent to 20 pennylands or one eighth of a markland. Like those measurements, it is based on the rent paid, rather than the actual land area. It was also known as a "tirung" (from Scottish Gaelic: tìr-unga), or a dabhach (same as daugh), which is a term of Pictish origin, also used in the east of Scotland too, but for a different measurement. The “ounceland” is thought to be of Norse origin, so it is possible that Norse (‘ounceland’) and native systems (dabhach) were conflated in the west.

Quotes
Skene in Celtic Scotland says:
"As soon as we cross the great chain of mountains separating the eastern from the western waters, we find a different system equally uniform. The ‘ploughgates’ and ‘oxgangs’ disappear, and in their place we find ‘dabhachs’ and ‘pennylands’. The portion of land termed a ‘dabhach’ is here also called a ‘tirung’ or ‘ounceland’, and each ‘dabhach’ contains 20 pennylands."

The Rev. Dr Campbell of Broadford on the island of Skye said:
"the system of land measure which prevailed in the Western Isles, and then took root in Argyll was neither Pictish nor Irish, but Norse. The unit was the 'ounce'-land, i.e. the extent of land which paid the rent of an ounce of silver. The word was borrowed by Gaelic and appears as 'unnsa'. The land term was 'unga', e.g. Unganab in North Uist and in Tiree. It appears in the old charters as 'teroung', 'teiroung', &c. This extent was divided into twenty parts—sometimes into only 18 – which parts being called 'peighinn'…"

Other uses 
The term unga/uinge is also used for an ingot.

See also
 Obsolete Scottish units of measurement
 In the East Highlands:
 Rood
 Scottish acre = 4 roods
 Oxgang (Damh-imir) = the area an ox could plow in a year (around 20 acres)
 Ploughgate (?) = 8 oxgangs
 Daugh (Dabhach) = 4 ploughgates
 In the West Highlands:
 Groatland - (Còta bàn) = basic unit
 Pennyland (Peighinn) = 2 groatlands
 Quarterland (Ceathramh) = 4 pennylands (8 groatlands)
 Ounceland (Tìr-unga) = 4 quarterlands (32 groatlands)
 Markland (Marg-fhearann) = 8 Ouncelands (varied)
 Townland (Baile)

References
  ((Dabhach, Peighinn, Unga) with corrections and additions).

Obsolete Scottish units of measurement
Units of area
Scandinavian Scotland